Seven or 7 Star(s) or star(s) may refer to:

Astronomy
 The Classical planets, /Seven Luminaries, being the five planets visible to the naked eye, plus the Sun and Moon
 Pleiades, also known as the Seven Sisters and the Seven Stars
 The Big Dipper or The Plough, the seven brightest stars of Ursa Major
 The Little Dipper
 Orion (constellation), (seven stars with four being his shoulders and feet plus three in Orion's Belt

Geographic features
 Seven-star Cave, Guilin, Guangxi, China
 Seven Star Crags, limestone crags in Guangdong Province, China
 Seven Star Mountain, extinct volcano in Taiwan

Pubs and taverns
 The Seven Stars, a popular English pub name - see Pub names#Trades, tools and products
Seven Stars, Holborn, London
Seven Stars, West Kensington, London
Seven Stars Public House, Bristol
The Seven Stars Inn, Robertsbridge, Sussex
Seven Stars, Falmouth, Cornwall
 The Seven Stars Tavern
Seven Stars Tavern, MD, Baltimore, the founding place of the (U.S.) Independent Order of Odd Fellows
Seven Stars Tavern, NJ, Woodstown, on the (U.S.) National Register of Historic Places

Rating systems
Star (classification), a grading system

Sporting
 Seven Star Praying Mantis Boxing, a subdivision of Northern Praying Mantis
 Seven Stars F.C., an association football club from Cape Town, South Africa
 Seven Stars (Cape Verdean basketball club), a basketball club

Literature
 The Jewel of Seven Stars, a 1903 novel by Bram Stoker
 Seven Stars, a collection of short stories by Kim Newman, related to the Stoker novel

Music 
"7 Stars", a song from the New Magnetic Wonder album by The Apples in Stereo

 "Seven Stars" (Air song)

"Seven for the seven stars in the sky", a line of the song Green Grow the Rushes, O

"Seven Stars", a song from the Theories of Flight album by Progressive Metal band Fates Warning

Other
Seven Stars, short name of the videogame Super Mario RPG
Seven Stars (TV channel), a Saudi Arabian TV channel
Sevenstar Flying Squid, Martialia hyadesii
Seven Stars (cigarette), a brand of cigarette
Seven Stars in Kyushu, an excursion train in Japan
John's vision of the Son of Man, which includes an image of Jesus with seven stars in his right hand
Seven Stars Luxury Hospitality and Lifestyle Awards, tourism and hospitality awards founded in 2013

See also
Heptagram or seven-pointed star